Allalom Music was an American independent record label founded in 2001. It mainly released indie pop and alternative music. Founded in Redmond, Oregon, it had its headquarters in South Texas before moving back to Portland, Oregon in the fall of 2005. On January 15, 2010 the label announced their closure.

Artists 

Agents of Future (2007–2010)
The Beauty (2008–2010)
Christopher & The Lion (2007–2008)
Jared Colinger (2004–2007)
Daddyboy (2006–2010)
Daniel Folmer (2007–2010)
Mansic  (2004–2005)
 Pacifico (2006–2010)
The Red Balloons (2006)
Seven Dynasties of Glass Children (2004–2008)
Yes, You Are Ferocious! (2008–2010)

Distributed artists
Deep Mosey
The Kingdom Is Moving!
Monday In London

Notable artists 

The Broadway Hush
The Cloves
The Divorce
Dolour
Kat Jones
Pilgrims
The Professional Americans
Sacha Sacket
Tess Wiley

Albums

Official
Mansic - The Loving Father (AM-002, Summer 2004)
Jared Colinger - Favourite Hallucination EP (AM-004, Summer 2006)
 Pacifico - Anthology (AM-005, Winter 2006)
 Pacifico - Side B:Rarities & Covers (AM-005B, Winter 2006)
Daddyboy - A Lovely Day (AM-006, Spring 2007)
Jared Colinger - Light From A Dying Star EP (AM-008, Summer 2007)
Christopher & The Lion / Daniel Folmer - Born To Movement, Vol. One Split (AM-009, Spring 2008)
 Pacifico - Facedown EP (AM-010, Summer 2008)
Yes, You Are Ferocious! - The Effects of Nuclear Weapons (AM-011, Spring 2009)
 Pacifico - Thin Skin & An Open Heart (AM-012, Fall 2009)

Distributed
Deep Mosey - Vis A Tergo (AMPR-001)
Jared colinger - The Summer EP (AMPR-002)
Monday In London - Self Titled EP (AMPR-003)

Compilations 

Various Artists - Everybody Needs Love (AM-001, Spring 2004)
Various Artists - We Make Our Own Mistakes, Volume One (AM-003, Spring 2006)
Various Artists - TOMFest Sampler / ClerestoryAV split (CAVAM-001, Aug 2006)
Various Artists - Establishing The Anti-Establishment (AM-007, Summer 2007)
Various Artists - TOMFest Sampler II (AM----, Summer 2007)
Various Artists - TOMFest Sampler III (AM-D01, Summer 2008)

Loserbroadcasting

At one point in time Allalom Music owned and operated Loserbroadcasting.com, a netlabel that offered full album downloads from various bands around the USA for free...this project never achieved the level of success they were looking for and the website was taken offline after less than a year. Two of the bands/albums from that project have been released as official CDs since the site went down.

All the albums available for download were designated "AM/LB-001", and they only got different numbers if they were released on CD.

Albums released on Loserbroadcasting
Anaphylaxis - Reverb EP (AM/LB-001, Spring 2005)
Stereo Deluxx - Pretty Time Bomb (AM/LB-001, Spring 2005)
Jared Colinger - The Darker Side of Happy  EP (AM/LB-002, Summer 2005)
Seven Dynasties of Glass Children - We Are Pretentious, Who Are You (AM/LB-003, Fall 2006)
Seven Dynasties of Glass Children - The Fall of Vaudeville (AM/LB-004, Spring 2007)

See also 
 List of record labels

External links 
 Allalom Music Official Website
 Allalom Music's Myspace

American independent record labels
Record labels established in 2001
Indie pop record labels
Alternative rock record labels
Oregon record labels
Defunct record labels of the United States
Privately held companies based in Oregon
2001 establishments in Oregon